National Highway 348B, commonly referred to as NH 348B is a national highway in India. It is a secondary route of National Highway 48.  NH-348B runs in the state of Maharashtra in India.

Route 
NH348B connects [[Near Ulwe]Padeghar], Jambhulpada, Kauli Belodak, Chirner, Sai and Raigad(Barapada) in the state of Maharashtra.

Junctions  
 
  Terminal near Ulwe.
  near Chirner
  Terminal near Raigad(Barapada).

See also 
 List of National Highways in India
 List of National Highways in India by state

References

External links 

 NH 348B on OpenStreetMap

National highways in India
National Highways in Maharashtra